Hike may refer to:
 Hiking, walking lengthy distances in the countryside or wilderness 
 Hiking (sailing), moving a sailor's body weight as far to windward (upwind) as possible, in order to counteract the force of the wind pushing sideways against the boat's sails
 Alternative spelling for Heka (god), an Egyptian god
 Hike (American football), another word for "snap"
 Hike (dog mushing), a command to a dog team
 Hike Messenger, a messaging application

ca:Llista de personatges de la mitologia egípcia#H